A bisht (plural:  bishūt and  bshūt), known in some Arabic spoken dialects as mishlaḥ or ʿabāʾ, is a traditional men’s cloak popular in the Arab world, and worn in general for thousands of years. 

According to ancient Christian and Hebrew paintings, a similar robe was worn in the days of Jesus, by the people of the Levant.  

The bisht is a flowing outer cloak worn over a thawb.

A symbol of Arab identity 
A bisht is usually worn for prestige on special occasions such as weddings, or festivals such as Eid, or for Ṣalāt al-Jumuʿah or Salat al-Janazah. It is usually worn by secular officials or clergy,  including tribal chiefs, kings, and imams over a thawb, kanzu or tunic. It is a status garment, associated with royalty, religious position, wealth, and ceremonial occasions such as weddings, like the black-tie tuxedo in the West.

Etymology
The triliteral root of the word bisht is widely used in Semitic languages, including Arabic, and is related to the Akkadian bishtu, meaning 'nobility' or 'dignity'.

The alternate name of ʿabāʾ is from the Arabic triliteral root ʿAyn-Bāʾ-Wāw, which relates to 'filling out'.

Colour 
It is usually black, brown, beige, cream or grey in colour.

Manufacturing 
Bisht is made from camel's hair and goat wool that is spun and wove into a breathable fabric. Some bisht garments include a trim, known as "zari", made out of silk and metals such as gold and silver.

The fabric has a soft yarn for the summer and the coarse-haired for winter.

In popular culture 
In the 2022 FIFA World Cup final, Qatari Emir Tamim bin Hamad Al Thani placed a bisht on the Argentine captain Lionel Messi before the 35-year-old was handed the trophy.

See also

References

External links
 Bisht on alrashidmall.com

Islamic male clothing
Middle Eastern clothing
Arabic clothing
Robes and cloaks